The Hungarian Cup is the Hungarian cup competition for water polo. It has been incepted by the Hungarian Water Polo Federation, the Magyar Vízilabda Szövetség in 1923, nineteen years after the commencement of the Hungarian League, the Országos Bajnokság.

Most successful participant in the Magya Kupa has been the Újpest with 19 wins, followed by the local rivals from Ferencváros with 17 cups. The current holders are Szolnok.

Winners
In 1923 the final was played only in the following year. In 1939 the Magyar AC, before the final came back, many of its players were disqualified or injured or busy at work. In 1996 they played two series (in March and December).
Previous cup winners are: 

 1923: Ferencváros
 1924: Ferencváros
 1925: III. Kerületi TVE
 1926: Ferencváros
 1927: III. Kerületi TVE
 1928: MTK Budapest
 1929: Újpest
 1930: III. Kerületi TVE
 1931: Újpest
 1932: Újpest
 1933: Újpest
 1934: Újpest
 1935: Újpest
 1936: Újpest
 1937: MTK Budapest
 1938: Újpest
 1939: Újpest
 1940: Magyar AC
 1941: Budapest SE
 1942: Budapest SE
 1943: Magyar AC
 1944: Újpest
 1945: Not Played
 1946: MTK Budapest
 1947: Vasas
 1948: Újpest
 1949: Ferencváros
 1950: Not Played
 1951: Újpest
 1952: Újpest
 1953: Bp. Honvéd
 1954: Bp. Honvéd
 1955: Újpest
 1956: Not Played
 1957: Ferencváros
 1958: Bp. Honvéd
 1959: Bp. Honvéd
 1960: Újpest
 1961: Vasas
 1962: Ferencváros
 1963: Újpest
 1964: Ferencváros
 1965: Ferencváros
 1966: Szolnok
 1967: Ferencváros
 1968: Szolnok
 1969: Ferencváros
 1970: OSC
 1971: Vasas
 1972: Eger
 1973: Ferencváros
 1974: OSC
 1975: Újpest
 1976: Ferencváros
 1977: Ferencváros
 1978: Ferencváros
 1979: Bp. Honvéd
 1980: Szentes
 1981: Vasas
 1982: BVSC
 1983: Vasas
 1984: Vasas
 1985: Szolnok
 1986/87: BVSC
 1987/88: Bp. Spartacus
 1988/89: Ferencváros
 1989/90: Ferencváros
 1990/91: Újpest
 1991/92: Vasas
 1992/93: Újpest
 1993/94: Vasas
 1994/95: BVSC
 1995/96: Vasas
 1996 : Ferencváros
 1997: Vasas
 1998/99: Bp. Honvéd
 1999/00: BVSC
 2000/01: Vasas
 2001/02: Vasas
 2002/03: BVSC
 2004: Vasas
 2005: Vasas
 2006: Bp. Honvéd
 2007: Eger
 2008: Eger
 2009: Vasas
 2010: Bp. Honvéd
 2011: Szeged
 2012: Szeged
 2013: Szeged
 2014: Szolnok
 2015: Eger
 2016: Szolnok
 2017: Szolnok
 2018: Ferencváros
 2019: Ferencváros
 2020: Ferencváros
 2021: Ferencváros

Finals
The following table contains all the finals from the sixty years long history of the Magyar Kupa. In some occasions, there was not held a final match but a final tournament. In these cases, the team with the most total points have been crowned as cup winners.

Notes
Note 1: Újpest did not play

Performances

By club
The performance of various clubs is shown in the following table:

Notes

By county

 The bolded teams are currently playing in the 2018-19 season of the Hungarian League.

Statistics

Records in the Final
Most wins: 19
Újpest (1929, 1931, 1932, 1933, 1934, 1935, 1936, 1938, 1939, 1944, 1948, 1951, 1952, 1955, 1960, 1963, 1975, 1991, 1993)
Most consecutive titles: 6
Újpest (1931, 1932, 1933, 1934, 1935, 1936)
Most consecutive appearances: 8
Magyar AC (1934, 1935, 1936, 1937, 1938, 1939, 1940, 1941 - winning one)
Most appearances: 32
Ferencváros (1923, 1924, 1925, 1926, 1927, 1942, 1943, 1944, 1946, 1949, 1951, 1957, 1962, 1963, 1964, 1965, 1967, 1969, 1971, 1972, 1973, 1976, 1977, 1978, 1979, 1989, 1990, 1991, 1996 , 1997, 1999, 2002)
Biggest win:
Szolnok 13–4 OSC (2017)
Most goals in a final: 27
Vasas 14–13 (a.e.t.) Eger (2009)
Most goals by a losing side: 13
Vasas 14–13 (a.e.t.) Eger (2009)
Most defeats in a final: 15
Ferencváros (1925, 1927, 1942, 1943, 1944, 1946, 1951, 1963, 1971, 1972, 1979, 1991, 1997, 1999, 2002)

Finals venues and host cities

In the list below are included all the stadiums, inclusive the stadiums from finals with 2 legs.

Notes:
Note 1: Formerly known as Nemzeti Sportuszoda.
Note 2: Formerly known as Császár fürdő.

Sponsorship

See also
 Országos Bajnokság I (National Championship of Hungary)

References

External links
 Hungarian Water Polo Federaration 
 A magyar sport évkönyve, Magyar Sportévkönyv
 Magyar Kupa winners